Tunisian Presidential Security is the apparatus responsible of the security of the President of Tunisia.

Structure 
It is composed of 9,000 members of the police and 12,000 members from the State Security of Tunisia.

General Directors:
 Abderrahmen Haj Ali (?-1990)
 Ali Soryati (1990-January 16, 2011)
 Taoufik Dabbabi (January 16, 2010 – present)

See also
 2015 Tunis bombing - a bombing that killed presidential guards

Military units and formations of Tunisia
Law enforcement agencies in Africa
Security